Wong Wee Nam was a Singaporean physician and opposition politician who ran against the ruling People's Action Party in the 1997 general election as part of the National Solidarity Party.

1997 general election 
Wong contested the Hong Kah Group Representation Constituency (GRC) in the 1997 general election as an opposition candidate under the banner of the National Solidarity Party, along with Steve Chia, Patrick Kee, Tan Chee Kien and Yadzeth Bin Hairis. He and his team garnered 36,920 votes, losing to the incumbent People's Action Party which garnered 82,182 votes.

Personal life and career 
Wong graduated from the National University of Singapore (then University of Singapore) in 1972 with a MBBS. Upon graduation, he became a houseman and served his National Service as a Medical Officer. Following a stint in the hospital, he went on to pursue a career at Asia Dispensary and Island Group, before starting his own practice, Wong Clinic and Surgery, and working as a general practitioner until 2016, when he retired. He also worked at the National University of Singapore as a clinical teacher in the Department of Family Medicine. Wong also held a LLB from the University of London. He died on the 7th of September 2019 from Parkinson's disease.

Bibliography 
Wong also authored Thoughts from a Gilded Cage, which was published in 2018 by Word Image Pte Ltd.

References 

Year of birth missing
20th-century births
2019 deaths
Alumni of the University of London
National University of Singapore alumni
National Solidarity Party (Singapore) politicians
20th-century Singaporean politicians
21st-century Singaporean politicians
20th-century Singaporean physicians
21st-century Singaporean physicians
Deaths from Parkinson's disease